Joan Jeanrenaud ( Dutcher; born January 25, 1956) is an American cellist. A native of Memphis, Tennessee, she played with the LLP Kronos Quartet from 1978 until 1999, when, after a sabbatical, she left to pursue a solo career and collaborations with other artists, in part due to being diagnosed with multiple sclerosis.
She has staged and recorded solo performance pieces, playing the cello in tandem with electronic instruments. Her first solo album, Metamorphosis, was described by Greg Cahill in Strings as "visceral, hypnotic, and often compelling."

Jeanrenaud plays a Deconet, ca. 1750.  A copy of the cello carved out of ice was used in her four-hour performance piece Ice Cello, a 2004 adaptation of Charlotte Moorman's Ice Music for London.

In 2008, her album Strange Toys (Talking House Records, 2008) was nominated for a Grammy Award. The album was produced by PC Muñoz, with whom Jeanrenaud later collaborated on another album, Pop-Pop (Deconet Records, 2010), which she called "a pop record that wasn't actually pop."

She also has performed in collaborations with Larry Ochs' group Kihnoua at San Francisco's De Young Museum (2008).

She has performed in many film scores by composer William Susman and appears on the soundtrack CDs for Oil on Ice (2005), Fate of the Lhapa (2007) and Music for Moving Pictures (2009).

Discography
Metamorphosis (New Albion, 2002)
Oil On Ice (with William Sussman) (Belarca Records, 2004)
Fly Fly Fly (with Larry Ochs, Miya Masaoka) (Intakt Records, 2004)
For Birds, Planes & Cello (with Miya Masaoka) (Solitary B, 2005)
Strange Toys (Talking House Records, 2008)
Pop-Pop (with PC Muñoz) (Deconet Records, 2010)
The Sands of Time (with Mark Grey) (Other Minds, 2014)
Hommage (Other Minds, 2014)
Visual Music (Deconet Records, 2016)
Second Time Around (with Charlie Varon) (Deconet Records, 2016)
With Fred Frith and Maybe Monday
Digital Wildlife (Winter & Winter, 2002)

References

External links
Official website

American classical cellists
1956 births
Living people
Musicians from Tennessee
People from Memphis, Tennessee
American women in electronic music
American women classical cellists
Intakt Records artists
Winter & Winter Records artists
21st-century American women